The Pionero is a ferry operating in Tierra Del Fuego owned and run by the Chilean firm Transbordadora Austral Broom S.A. It serves the Strait of Magellan between Punta Delgada and Punta Espora across the Primera Angostura.

Tierra del Fuego
Ferries of Chile
Strait of Magellan